Donkey Kong Jr. may refer to:

 Donkey Kong Jr., a 1982 arcade game
 Donkey Kong Jr. (character), the protagonist of the game
 Donkey Kong Jr. (Game & Watch), a Game & Watch version of the game
 Donkey Kong Jr. Math, a 1983 edutainment game featuring the titular character